Swarna Kaduva is a 2016 Indian Malayalam-language satirical film directed by Jose Thomas, starring Biju Menon. The script is written by Babu Janardhanan. The film was released on 4 November 2016.

Synopsis
Rinichen is a self made right-hand man of businessman Lonappan. Over the years he takes advantage of Lonappan for solving shady problems. When everything seems to boilover at the gravy train he uses the opportunity and asks Lonappan to help him settle elsewhere with a jewellery shop. Rinichen who had a hard life and was from once well known family starts care evermore for money & status and life starts to make him pay for karmic debts of his unethical previous engagements. The rest of the film explores whether Rinichen will rebound or go further down the rabbit hole.

Cast 

 Biju Menon as Rini Iype Maatummel
 Iniya as Lovely 
 Innocent Vareed as Lonappan
 Suresh Krishna as Divakaran
 Sudheer Karamana as Advocate Paul 
 Baiju Santhosh as Inspector Sasidharan
 Hareesh Perumanna as Joju 
 Poojitha Menon  as Deepthi
 Kottayam Nazeer 
 Naseer Sankranthi as Broker
 Santhosh Keezhattoor as Surendran
 Kishor Satya as Johnnychan
 Kalabhavan Jinto as Binoy
 Jayakumar Parameswaran Pillai as Father
 Jayasankar Karimuttam 
 George
 Minon as Tamil boy
 Anju Aravind as Geethu Nair 
 Seema G. Nair as Binoy's mother 
 Sobha Singh as Rini's mother
 Chinnu Kuruvila as Anitha
 Rosin Jolly as Mollykutty
 Saju Kodiyan as Mollykutty's brother 
 Swasika Vijay as Riya 
 Rakhi as Swapna

Release 
The film was earlier scheduled for a release on 28 October 2016, but to avoid competing with Pulimurugan, it was rescheduled to 4 November 2016. The film released in 104 screens in Kerala.

Box office
In Kerala, the film collected 2.10 crore on its opening day. The film collected 1.6 crores in the first weekend and 2.34 crores in the three weekend from US box office.

References 

2010s Malayalam-language films
Indian comedy films
2016 films
Films directed by Jose Thomas
2016 comedy films
Films shot in Thrissur